The 2011–12 La Liga season (known as the Liga BBVA for sponsorship reasons) was the 81st season of the top level Spanish association football competition. The campaign began on 27 August 2011, and ended on 13 May 2012. Real Madrid won a record 32nd title following victory over Athletic Bilbao on 2 May 2012. 

Real Madrid broke a number of league records, including most points in a single season (100), most goals scored (121), best goal difference (+89), most away wins (16), and most overall wins (32). This season also saw Lionel Messi score a record 50 league goals in 37 games. Behind Messi was Real Madrid's Cristiano Ronaldo, who scored 46 goals; the pair's combined tally of 96 goals was the most ever by two players playing in the same major European league in the same season.

The season was scheduled to start on 20 August 2011, but was delayed due to a strike called by the Association of Spanish Footballers (AFE).

Teams
Deportivo de La Coruña, Hércules CF from Alicante and UD Almería were relegated to the 2011–12 Segunda División after finishing in the bottom three spots of the table at the end of the 2010–11 season. Deportivo were relegated to the Segunda División after 20 seasons of continuous membership in the top football league of Spain, while Almería ended a four-year tenure in La Liga and Hércules made their immediate return to the second level.

The three relegated teams were replaced by three 2010–11 Segunda División sides. Champions Betis, who terminated their second-level status after two years, runners-up Rayo Vallecano, who returned to the top flight after eight seasons at lower levels, earned direct promotion.

The third promoted team was decided in the promotion play-offs where Granada CF returned to the league for the first time in 35 years, having spent 26 of them in Segunda División B and Tercera División.

Stadiums and locations

Personnel and sponsorship
As in the previous years, Nike provided the official ball for all matches, with a new T90 Seitiro model which was used throughout the season.

 For 8 matches in round 20, 31–32, 34–38.
 Only against Real Madrid match in round 33.
 On the back of shirt.
 Barcelona makes a donation to UNICEF in order to display the charity's logo on the club's kit.
 Club's own brand.
 Málaga makes a donation to UNESCO in order to display the charity's logo on the club's kit.
 On the shoulders.
 Since 31 January 2012.
 On the shorts.
 On the sleeves.

Managerial changes

League table

Results

Awards

LaLiga Awards
La Liga's governing body, the Liga Nacional de Fútbol Profesional, honoured the competition's best players and coach with the LaLiga Awards.

Top goalscorers
The Pichichi Trophy is awarded by the newspaper Marca to the player who scores the most goals in a season.

Source: Liga BBVA

Zamora Trophy
The Zamora Trophy is awarded by newspaper Marca to the goalkeeper with least goals-to-games ratio. A goalkeeper must play at least 28 games of 60 or more minutes to be eligible for the trophy.

Fair Play award
This award is given annually since 1999 to the team with the best fair play during the season. This ranking takes into account aspects such as cards, suspension of matches, audience behaviour and other penalties. This section not only aims to determine the best fair play, but also serves to break the tie in teams that are tied in all the other rules: points, head-to-head, goal difference and goals scored.

Source: 2011–12 Fair Play Rankings Season

 Sources of cards and penalties: Referee's reports, Competition Committee's Sanctions, Appeal Committee Resolutions and RFEF's Directory about Fair Play Rankings

Pedro Zaballa award
Comité Técnico de Árbitros de Fútbol de Las Palmas

Scoring
First goal of the season:   Imanol Agirretxe for Real Sociedad against Sporting de Gijón (27 August 2011)
Last goal of the season:   Rovérsio for Osasuna against Racing Santander (13 May 2012)

Hat-tricks

4 Player scored four goals(H) - Home ; (A) - Away

See also
 List of Spanish football transfers summer 2011
 List of Spanish football transfers winter 2011–12
 2011–12 Segunda División

References

External links

LigaBBVA.com
sportYou.es
Inside Spanish Football

2011-12
1
Spa